Aiouea angulata is a species of plant in the family Lauraceae. It is endemic to Colombia.

References

angulata
Endemic flora of Colombia
Endangered plants
Taxonomy articles created by Polbot
Plants described in 1938
Taxa named by André Joseph Guillaume Henri Kostermans